The second season of the American situation comedy television series, The Office, premiered in the United States on NBC on September 20, 2005, and ended on May 11, 2006.  The season had 22 episodes, including its first 40-minute "super-sized" episode.  The Office is an American adaptation of the British TV series of the same name, and is presented in a mockumentary format, documenting the daily lives of office employees in the Scranton, Pennsylvania branch of the fictitious Dunder Mifflin Paper Company. The season stars Steve Carell, Rainn Wilson, John Krasinski, Jenna Fischer, and B. J. Novak, with supporting performances from Melora Hardin, David Denman, Leslie David Baker, Brian Baumgartner, Kate Flannery, Angela Kinsey, Oscar Nunez, and Phyllis Smith.

Beginning with "The Dundies", the second season further developed into the plot of the fear of company downsizing, along with the introduction of new characters and developing some of the other characters—especially that of Dwight Schrute (Rainn Wilson). Michael Scott (Steve Carell) soon starts a relationship with his boss Jan Levinson (Melora Hardin), and Pam Beesly (Jenna Fischer) and Jim Halpert's (John Krasinski) relationship become one of the focal points of the season. Their compatibility becomes more obvious as Jim's feelings for Pam continue to grow, while she struggles with her relationship with warehouse worker Roy Anderson (David Denman).

Season two of The Office aired on Tuesdays in the United States at 9:30 p.m. from September 20, 2005 to December 6, 2005. The timeslot changed to Thursdays at 9:30 p.m. from January 5, 2006 to May 11, 2006. The season was a ratings success, bolstered by Carell's success in the 2005 film The 40 Year Old Virgin. The season also received widespread  acclaim from critics, with many calling it one of the greatest sitcom seasons ever produced. The second season was released in a four-disc DVD boxset in Region 1 on September 12, 2006, and in Region 2 on January 28, 2008.  The DVD set contained all 22 episodes, as well as commentaries from creators, writers, actors, and directors on some of the episodes, while also containing deleted scenes from all of the episodes. It was released by Universal Studios Home Entertainment.

Production 

The second season of the show was produced by Reveille Productions and Deedle-Dee Productions, both in association with NBC Universal Television Studios.  The show is based on the British series created by Ricky Gervais and Stephen Merchant, who are executive producers on the show. The Office is produced by Greg Daniels, who is also executive producer and show runner. Returning writers from last season include Daniels, Larry Wilmore, Michael Schur, Mindy Kaling, Paul Lieberstein, and B. J. Novak. Joining the writing staff for the second season are Lee Eisenberg and Gene Stupnitsky, who also served as story editors, and Jennifer Celotta, who was a consulting producer. Some of the actors also received promotions: Kaling was promoted to story editor, Novak became a co-producer, and Lieberstein became a co-executive producer. Series star, Steve Carell, wrote his first Office episode, the season finale, "Casino Night". 

Season two featured episodes directed by eight different directors, each of whom aside from Bryan Gordon directed multiple episodes. Gordon, Ken Kwapis, Ken Whittingham, and Daniels had all previously directed episodes during season one, while Dennie Gordon, Paul Feig, Victor Nelli, Jr., and Charles McDougall each made their directorial debut for the show.  While The Office was mainly filmed on a studio set at Valley Center Studios in Van Nuys, California, the city of Scranton, Pennsylvania, where the show is set, was also used for shots of the opening theme. 

Despite low ratings from the first season of the show, NBC renewed The Office for a second season. Originally, six episodes were ordered, but NBC later ordered an additional seven. In early November, NBC again expanded the season by ordering three more episodes, before ordering a full season of 22 episodes in January 2006.

Cast 

The Office employs an ensemble cast. All of the main characters, and some minor ones, are based on characters from the British version of The Office.  While these characters normally have the same attitudes and perceptions as their British counterparts, the roles have been redesigned to better fit the American show.  The show is known for its large cast size, many of whom are known particularly for their improvisational work.

Main
 Steve Carell as Michael Scott, regional manager of the Dunder Mifflin Scranton Branch. Loosely based on David Brent, Gervais' character in the British version, Scott is a dim-witted and lonely man, who attempts to win friends as the office comedian, usually making himself look bad in the process.  
 Rainn Wilson as Dwight Schrute, who, based upon Gareth Keenan, is the assistant to the regional manager, although the character frequently fails to include "to the" in his title. 
 John Krasinski as Jim Halpert, a sales representative and prankster, who is based upon Tim Canterbury, and is in love with Pam Beesly, the receptionist. 
 Jenna Fischer as Pam Beesly, who is based on Dawn Tinsley, is shy, but is often a cohort with Jim in his pranks on Dwight. 
 B. J. Novak as Ryan Howard, who is a temporary worker.

Starring
Halfway through the season, eight of the show's recurring guest stars were promoted to series regulars and credited just after the main titles and before the writers and producers.

 Melora Hardin as Jan Levinson, Michael's main love interest and vice president of regional sales.
 David Denman as Roy Anderson, a warehouse worker and Pam's fiance.
 Leslie David Baker as Stanley Hudson, a grumpy salesman.
 Brian Baumgartner as Kevin Malone, a dim-witted accountant.
 Kate Flannery as Meredith Palmer, the promiscuous supplier relations rep.
 Angela Kinsey as Angela Martin, a judgmental accountant, who also serves as Dwight’s love interest.
 Oscar Nunez as Oscar Martinez, an intelligent accountant, who is also gay.
 Phyllis Smith as Phyllis Lapin, a motherly saleswoman.

Recurring
 Mindy Kaling as Kelly Kapoor, the pop culture-obsessed customer service representative.
 Paul Lieberstein as Toby Flenderson, the sad-eyed human resources representative.
 Creed Bratton, as Creed Bratton, the office's strange quality assurance officer.
 Craig Robinson as Darryl Philbin, the warehouse supervisor.
 Devon Abner as Devon White, a supplier relations representative.
 Hugh Dane as Hank Tate, the building's security guard.
 David Koechner as Todd Packer, a rude and offensive traveling salesman, who’s Michael’s best friend.
 Nancy Walls as Carol Stills, a real estate agent.
 Amy Adams as Katy Moore, a handbag saleswoman and Jim’s girlfriend.

Notable guests
 Lance Krall as Ira Glicksberg, Dwight’s sensei.
 Tim Meadows as Christian, a potential client for Dunder Mifflin.
 Bobby Ray Shafer as Bob Vance, Phyllis’ boyfriend, who runs Vance Refrigeration.
 Rob Riggle as Jack, the captain of the boat where the office has its booze cruise.
 Ken Howard as Ed Truck, Michael’s former boss.
 Patrice O’Neal as Lonny Collins, a warehouse worker.
 Andy Buckley as David Wallace, the new CFO of Dunder Mifflin.

Broadcast and reception

Ratings

The season premiere, "The Dundies" was viewed by 9.0 million viewers, a drastic increase from the first season finale "Hot Girl", which was viewed by only 4.8 million viewers. As the season progressed, the success of Carell's hit summer movie The 40-Year-Old Virgin and online sales of episodes at iTunes helped the show to garner viewers. The increase in viewership led NBC to move the series to the "Must See TV" Thursday night in January 2006, where ratings continued to grow. The season hit a ratings peak with the twelfth episode, "The Injury", which was viewed by 10.3 million viewers. The season finale, "Casino Night"—which was also the show's first forty-minute-long episode—was viewed by 7.6 million viewers. By the end of the 2005–06 season, it placed 67th (tied with 20/20). It averaged eight million viewers, and scored a 4.0/10 in the Nielsen ratings, meaning that on average four percent of households were tuned in at any given moment and ten percent of all televisions in use at the time were tuned into the program.  The show received dramatic gains in viewers from the previous year, up forty percent in total viewers and up sixty percent in viewers ages 18–49. A year-end report by NBC noted, "The Office was the fastest-growing series on television this season versus last ... The Office grew by 60 percent this season in adults 1849 (to an average 4.0 rating from a 2.5 the prior season)."

Reviews

The second season of The Office was released largely to critical acclaim and commercial success. Francis Rizzo III of DVD Talk wrote that the British version "can't hold a candle to the American" version during this season, due to the show coming "into its own, becoming the best half-hour show on TV." Furthermore, Rizzo wrote that the season was filled with "fantastically real characters" as well as "one of the best-handled romances in TV history". Eric Goldman of IGN noted that season two transformed The Office "from a very funny show into a truly brilliant show". Goldman praised the world-building of the season, writing that it "does a wonderful job of developing the rest of the staff of Dunder-Mifflin , something the UK version could never do to this extent". He ultimately gave it a ten out of ten score. Josh Wolk, an Entertainment Weekly television critic, said that the show has "perfecting workaday moments so hilariously and relatably awkward that it makes viewers both laugh and cringe".

The season was also a commercial success. Midway through the season, a deal was made with Apple Inc to offer the show's episodes for download on the iTunes store. This action, in turn, led to many fans buying the series before the DVD set was released. For some time, "The Carpet", the season's fourteenth episode, was the second most-downloaded episode of a television show in the store, and by early January 2006, episodes from The Office occupied ten of the twenty slots in the iTunes list of most popular downloads. In 2006, after the release of the DVD, the second season was the seventeenth highest selling DVD on Amazon that year.

Accolades 
The second season of The Office received five Primetime Emmy Awards nominations at the 58th Primetime Emmy Awards, and won the award for Outstanding Comedy Series.  Other nominations included Outstanding Lead Actor in a Comedy Series for Steve Carell, for his portrayal of Michael Scott, Outstanding Writing for a Comedy Series for Michael Schur, for the episode "Christmas Party", and Outstanding Single-Camera Picture Editing for a Comedy Series for both "Christmas Party", edited by David Rogers, and "Booze Cruise", edited by Dean Holland. Carell also received the Television Critic's Award for Best Individual Achievement in Comedy, and the show received the Television Critic's Award for Outstanding Achievement in Comedy. For the episode "Michael's Birthday", Ken Whittingham won the award for Outstanding Director in Comedy Series at the NAACP Image Awards. At the 2007 Writers Guild of America Awards, The Office received the award for Best Comedy Series, and Carell won the award for Episodic Comedic Writing for the episode "Casino Night". The Office was also honored as a recipient of a Peabody Award in 2006, honoring the show for excellence in radio and/or television broadcasting.

Episodes 

 denotes a "super-sized" 40-minute episode (with advertisements; actual runtime around 28 minutes).

DVD release

References

External links 
 
 

2005 American television seasons
2006 American television seasons
The Office (American season 2) episodes